Santiago do Norte is a village in the state of Mato Grosso in the Central-West Region of Brazil. It is the urban extension of Paranatinga.

See also 
 List of municipalities in Mato Grosso

References 

Populated places in Mato Grosso